Wildes Perkins Walker Veazie (April 3, 1870 – June 25, 1948) was an American college football coach.  He served as the head coach of the University of Maine's football team in 1893 and compiled a 0–5 record. He was an alumnus of Harvard University.

Head coaching record

References

External links
 

1870 births
1948 deaths
Maine Black Bears football coaches
Harvard University alumni
Sportspeople from Bangor, Maine